The Nosy Tanihely National Park in a national park on the island of Nosy Tanihely and covers an area of 341 ha. It is located 8.5 km South of Nosy Be and East of Nosy Komba.

References

Islands of Madagascar
Diana Region
Uninhabited islands of Madagascar

National parks of Madagascar